A. Isabel Garcia is an American dentist and academic administrator serving as dean of the University of Florida College of Dentistry since 2015. She was deputy director of the National Institute of Dental and Craniofacial Research (NIDCR) from 2007 to 2014. Garcia was the acting NIDCR director from 2010 to 2011. She was a Rear Admiral Lower Half in the U.S. Public Health Service Commissioned Corps.

Education 
Garcia completed a bachelor's degree in chemistry at the University of Mary Washington in 1976. She earned a doctor of dental science degree from the Medical College of Virginia in 1980. She earned a master's degree in public health from the University of Michigan School of Public Health in 1988. She completed a residency in dental public health at Michigan and a fellowship in primary care policy in the United States Public Health Service.

Career 
During the early 1980s, Garcia was in private practice in Richmond, Virginia. She held local and state health management positions, including county health director for the Virginia division of dental health and director of dental research and evaluation in the Ohio Department of Health. 

Garcia was a health scientist administrator at the Agency for Healthcare Research and Quality where she managed research on health services and primary care. Garcia joined the National Institute of Dental and Craniofacial Research (NIDCR) in 1995 as a special assistant for science transfer. She directed activities to promote science-based practice, developed science transfer activities for clinicians, and led the development of a curriculum supplement on oral health science for use by elementary school teachers. From 2004 to 2007, Garcia was director of the NIDCR office of science policy and analysis. A captain in the United States Public Health Service Commissioned Corps, she became the director of the dental public health residency program at NIDCR in 2005. Garcia is a diplomate of the American Board of Dental Public Health. In February 2007, she succeeded Dushanka Kleinman as the NIDCR deputy director. In 2010, Garcia succeeded Lawrence A. Tabak as acting NIDCR director. She was succeeded by Martha Somerman in 2011. She is a fellow of the American College of Dentists. Garcia retired from the Public Health Service as a rear admiral lower half in 2014.

On February 16, 2015, Garcia became dean of the University of Florida College of Dentistry. She succeeded interim dean Boyd Robinson who had replaced dean Teresa A. Dolan.

See also 

 Women in dentistry in the United States

References 

Living people
Year of birth missing (living people)
Place of birth missing (living people)
United States Public Health Service Commissioned Corps officers
University of Mary Washington alumni
Medical College of Virginia alumni
University of Michigan School of Public Health alumni
National Institutes of Health people
University of Florida faculty
American women academics
American dentistry academics
21st-century American women scientists
Hispanic and Latino American scientists
Women deans (academic)
American university and college faculty deans
Women dentists